Gavar (also Romanized as Gavār) is a village in Sedeh Rural District, in the Central District of Arak County, Markazi Province, Iran. At the 2006 census, its population was 2,682, in 784 families.

References 

Populated places in Arak County